Mount Mourne is an unincorporated community in Iredell County, North Carolina, United States. The Mount Mourne post office was originally established on April 5, 1805 with James Houston as postmaster. It has been in continuous operation since 1805 and currently has a ZIP code of 28123. The community was named by early settlers after Mourne Mountains in Northern Ireland. Rufus Reid (1787-1854) built the Mount Mourne Plantation in Mount Mourne in 1836. It is still standing.

In addition to Mount Mourne Plantation, the Centre Presbyterian Church, Session House and Cemeteries, Coddle Creek Associate Reformed Presbyterian Church, Session House and Cemetery, George Houston House, and Wood Lawn are listed on the National Register of Historic Places.

References

Unincorporated communities in Iredell County, North Carolina
Unincorporated communities in North Carolina